Trenton Grant Whitfield (born June 17, 1977) is a Canadian former ice hockey centre who currently serves as an associate coach for the Providence Bruins of the American Hockey League.

Playing career
Whitfield was drafted in the fourth round, 100th overall, by the Boston Bruins in the 1996 NHL Entry Draft. He refused to sign with Boston, and returned to Spokane until signing a minor league contract with Washington.

On August 2, 2005, Whitfield signed with the St. Louis Blues for the 2005–06 season. After playing in 30 games with the Blues, Whitfield was assigned to their AHL affiliate, the Peoria Rivermen. Whitfield spent the next three seasons with the Rivermen, relied upon as captain and establishing himself as an elite player in the AHL.

He was recalled by the Blues, playing against the Colorado Avalanche, at St. Louis on January 15, 2009, in his first NHL game since 2006.

On July 13, 2009, Whitfield signed a two-year contract with the Boston Bruins, returning to the team by which he was drafted. Added as depth to the Bruins forwards, the veteran was assigned to captain Boston's AHL affiliate, the Providence Bruins, to begin the 2009–10. On October 21, 2009, Whitfield was recalled and made his debut with Boston against the Nashville Predators. He totaled 16 games over the course of the season with the Bruins and scored 43 points in 52 games with the P-Bruins before making his playoff debut with Boston in four games against the Philadelphia Flyers. 

Prior to his second year with the Bruins on August 22, 2010, it was announced that Whitfield had torn his Achilles tendon and would likely miss the entirety of the 2010–11 season. Whitfield recovered from his injuries and played 45 games in the minors for Providence. He was called as a spare for Boston in March 2011. When Boston won the Stanley Cup in June 2011, Whitefield was included on the official team picture, and later awarded a Stanley Cup ring. However, since he only played in the minors, his name could not be included on the Stanley Cup. On July 1, 2011, Whitfield re-signed to a two-year contract with the Boston Bruins.

On August 22, 2013, after 15 seasons of professional hockey in North America, Whitfield signed his first European contract on a one-year deal with Italian club, HC Bolzano in their inaugural season in the Austrian Hockey League. He played one season with Bolzano, before retiring from his playing career.

Career statistics

Regular season and playoffs

International

Awards and honours

References

External links

1977 births
Living people
Bolzano HC players
Boston Bruins draft picks
Boston Bruins players
Canadian ice hockey centres
Hampton Roads Admirals players
Ice hockey people from Saskatchewan
New York Rangers players
People from Estevan
Peoria Rivermen (AHL) players
Portland Pirates players
Providence Bruins players
St. Louis Blues players
Spokane Chiefs players
Washington Capitals players
Canadian expatriate ice hockey players in the United States